= The Loudness of Sam =

1999 book by James Proimos

- Author: James Proimos
- Illustrator: James Proimos
- Language: English
- Genre: children's literature
- Publisher: Harcourt, Inc.
- Publication date: 1999
- Publication place: United States
- ISBN: 0-15-202087-X

The Loudness of Sam (Harcourt, ISBN 0-15-202087-X) is a 1999 American children's book written and illustrated by James Proimos.

== Overview ==
Sam is a child whose laughs and cries were extraordinarily loud. "Is that nuts and bolts in the blender?" "No, that's just the baby." One day, Sam visits his quiet aunt in the city. On the last day of the visit, she laughs loudly, because the loudness of Sam is contagious!

=== Television series ===
The Loudness of Sam has its own animated television series, produced by the Canadian company Nelvana Enterprises, Inc..

== Reception ==
Publishers Weekly gave the book a starred review.
